Traci A. Bingham (born January 13, 1968) is an American actress, model, and television personality. Beginning her professional career in the early 1990s, Bingham is best known for her role as Jordan Tate on the NBC action drama television series Baywatch (1996–1998).

Biography

Early life and education

Bingham was born Julie Anne Smith to an African American and Italian mother and a Native American father. She was the youngest of seven children born in North Cambridge, Massachusetts, to Betty, a librarian, and Lafayette Bingham, an aircraft technician who served in World War II. For high school, Bingham attended Cambridge Rindge and Latin School; graduating in 1986.

Career
Bingham began her career in minor acting roles. Aside from Baywatch, Bingham's appearances include the television series D.R.E.A.M. Team and Beverly Hills, 90210, and the film Demon Knight. She also played minor roles in the popular American sitcoms The Fresh Prince of Bel-Air and Married... with Children. In 1991, Bingham appeared in the video for "Good Vibrations" by Marky Mark and the Funky Bunch. Eight years later, she appeared in the video for "I Really Like It" by Harlem World featuring Mase and Kelly Price.

In June 1998, Bingham posed for a "Babes of Baywatch" pictorial in Playboy magazine. Bingham has appeared on a number of reality television programs. In 2004, she was in the second series of The Surreal Life. Her castmates included Ron Jeremy, Vanilla Ice, Erik Estrada, Tammy Faye Bakker, and Trishelle Cannatella. Two years later, she flew to England to appear in Celebrity Big Brother, where she made it to the final six contestants and was evicted on the final night of the show. She selected Families of SMA as the charity to receive a donation from her participation in the show because her niece had died from spinal muscular atrophy (SMA).

In 2005, Bingham was hired as a spokesmodel by Empire Poker, an online gambling site that ceased operations in 2006. In 2007, Bingham appeared on VH1's The Surreal Life: Fame Games and won the $100,000 grand prize. In 2008, Bingham appeared on Fox Reality's Gimme My Reality Show! competing with six other celebrities to get their own reality show. Bingham appeared on The 2008 World Magic Awards television show.

Activism

Bingham is a vegetarian. In May 2002, she appeared in a vegetarian advertisement wearing a bikini made of lettuce, and in May 2006 she appeared nude in an ad as part of PETA's "I'd Rather Be Naked Than Wear Fur" campaign.

Personal life

Bingham has been married twice and has no children. Her first husband was Finnian Lozada. From August 29, 1998 until January 18, 2001, Bingham was married to songwriter and musician Robb Vallier. In 2014, A Massachusetts court issued an arrest warrant for Bingham after she failed to appear in court regarding a breached XXX adult contract. After taking the money, Bingham did not show up for the production.

Filmography

Film

Television

Documentary

References

External links

"Traci Bingham's Sexy Ad Reveal". PETA (People for the Ethical Treatment of Animals), YouTube. November 4, 2008.

1968 births
20th-century American actresses
20th-century African-American people
20th-century African-American women
21st-century African-American people
21st-century African-American women
Living people
Actresses from Cambridge, Massachusetts
Actresses from Massachusetts
African-American actresses
American film actresses
American television actresses
American vegetarianism activists
Cambridge Rindge and Latin School alumni
Native American people from Massachusetts
Reality show winners